TriGeo Network Security is a United Statesbased provider of security information and event management (SIEM) technology.  The company helps midmarket organizations proactively, protects networks and data from internal and external threats, with a SIEM appliance that provides real-time log management and automated network defense - from the perimeter to the endpoint.

TriGeo’s appliance-based solution combines security event management, security information management and log management and intelligence into a single device.

History
The company’s first major commercial product release, TriGeo Security Information Manager (SIM), debuted in January 2002 to help users automatically identify, notify and respond to suspicious behavior, policy violations, and network attacks. TriGeo’s SIM solution has evolved since its debut, introducing its 64-bit SIM appliance and provides real-time analysis for network infrastructure devices such as deep packet inspection firewalls, intrusion detection and intrusion prevention data.

In July 2011, the company was acquired by SolarWinds, a developer and marketer of network, applications and storage management software.

Focus
TriGeo SIM is sold exclusively to midmarket organizations and targets a variety of businesses, including banks, credit unions, retailers, government agencies, utilities, education, media and entertainment companies, and healthcare providers. The company also offers several add-on features including its nDepth, nSight and USB-Defender products, which support additional functionality and security.

Security Information Manager (SIM) addresses industry-specific remediation requirements by monitoring firewalls, intrusion detection systems, intrusion prevention systems, routers, switches, VPNs, servers, anti-virus software, and workstation activity.  By providing broad device coverage and multiple device event correlation, SIM can accurately detect anomalous behavior with a low false positive rate. Once an unauthorized or suspicious activity is identified, SIM instantly notifies and transmits security alerts via e-mail, cell phones, pagers, and handheld devices. Also, the technology can be configured to automatically respond by blocking an IP address, routing traffic, quarantining a workstation from the rest of the network or controlling applications and access control services based on user-defined rules and active defense policies. TriGeo SIM also has reporting capabilities for emerging compliance mandates like SarbanesOxley, the Health Insurance Portability and Accountability Act (HIPAA), Gramm-Leach-Bliley Act (GLBA) and the Payment Card Industry Data Security Standards (PCI DSS).

TriGeo nDepth, which combines log aggregation and archiving with real-time event correlation and proactive response, gives businesses the ability to forensically search through log data from multiple devices for specific information and events.

TriGeo nSight, powered by Qliktech, is a business intelligence solution that gives companies the ability to drill down into and correlate log data to discover new threats and improve network visibility.

TriGeo’s USB-Defender blocks unauthorized USB drive and device use and alerts administrators to USB violations, helping prevent the theft of corporate data and the introduction of external viruses onto the network.

Partners 
Check Point, COMPUTERLINKS, Dell, Hewlett-Packard, IBM, McAfee, Microsoft, PhoenixDatacom, Qliktech, Sun Microsystems, Symantec, TippingPoint, VMWare and Websense.

Selected Customers 
Alliant Credit Union, American Bank and Trust Company, Bakers Footwear, Bank of McKenney, Chicago Stock Exchange, DirecTV, Castle Rock Broadcast Center, Fairwinds Credit Union, Farmers & Merchants Bank, First Arkansas Bank, First National Bank – Cortez, First Savings Bank of Renton, Fort Sill Federal Credit Union, Georgia's Own Credit Union, Hitachi Medical Systems America (HMSA), Maverik Inc., MyBank  Bank of Belen, National Research Corporation, NexBank, O'Bannon Bank, Pasadena Federal Credit Union, San Diego County Credit Union, Santa Fe Bank, Fiserv, Inc., Stillwater National Bank, National Aquarium in Baltimore, TruMark Financial Credit Union, United Community Bank, United States Postal Service Federal Credit Union, Upper Chesapeake Health, Wilsons Leather, Windsor Management Group

Industry Acronyms
LMI – Log Management and IntelligenceSEM – Security Event ManagementSIM – Security Information Management

References 

 TriGeo Security Information Manager (SIEM), SC Magazine, August 2010
 Virtual Reality: Adoption of Virtualization,SC Magazine, July, 2010
 Preventing Shoes From Dropping, Stores Magazine, July, 2010
Handheld Hazard, Credit Union Magazine, April, 2009
Security information management finally arrives, thanks to enhanced features, SearchFinancialSecurity.com, August, 2008
A big SIEM solution designed for small companies, Network World, August, 2008
Getting value out of security log files, Network World, May, 2008
The FutureNow List, Bank Technology News, April, 2008
Technology Helps With Fraud Protection, Credit Union Management, March, 2008
 Security Software Tools Expected to Mature in Small-to-Medium Businesses, Baseline, December, 2007
Stillwater National Touts TriGeo Product, American Banker, August, 2007
The rise of midmarket security, SearchSecurityChannel.com, July, 2007
Security Management Special Report: Under Fire, CIO Decisions, June, 2007

External links 
TriGeo Network Security’s Official Web site
TriGeo Network Security’s Blog: TriGeoSphere
TriGeo Network Security’s Twitter Page

Software companies established in 2001
Companies based in Idaho
Defunct software companies of the United States
Post Falls, Idaho
2001 establishments in Idaho